Inzhenerne is a village (selo) of Ukraine, in Polohy Raion of Zaporizhzhia Oblast.

2022 Russian invasion of Ukraine 
On 4 April 2022, the Russian army fired on an art school, causing the attic to catch fire. By the time State Emergency Service arrived at the scene, the fire had spread across 40 square meters.

References 

Commons category link is on Wikidata
Villages in Polohy Raion